Pratylenchus hexincisus is a plant pathogenic nematode infecting sunflowers.

References 

hexincisus
Plant pathogenic nematodes
Sunflower diseases